Ghul Kal (also Romanized as Ghūl Kal; also known as Eslāmābād) is a village in Hayat Davud Rural District, in the Central District of Ganaveh County, Bushehr Province, Iran. At the 2006 census, its population was 236, in 51 families.

References 

Populated places in Ganaveh County